The Football League play-offs for the 2009–10 season were held in May 2010, with the finals taking place at Wembley Stadium in London. The play-off semi-finals were played over two legs, contested by the teams who finished in 3rd, 4th, 5th and 6th place in the Football League Championship and League One and the 4th, 5th, 6th and 7th placed teams in the League Two table. The winners of the semi-finals went through to the finals, with the winner of the final gaining promotion for the following season.

Background
The Football League play-offs have been held every year since 1987. They take place for each division following the conclusion of the regular season and are contested by the four clubs finishing below the automatic promotion places.

In the Championship, Nottingham Forest, who were aiming to return to the top flight for the first time since 1999, finished 12 points behind second placed West Bromwich Albion, who in turn finished 11 points behind champions Newcastle United, who returned to the top flight at the first attempt after relegation from the Premier League on the last day the season before. Cardiff City who haven't been in the top flight since 1962, finished in fourth place in the table. Leicester City who finished as champions of League One the season before, finished in fifth place looking for a return to the top flight for the first time in 6 years. Blackpool finished 6 points behind Leicester and Cardiff on 70 points, looking for a first spell back in the top flight since 1971.

Championship

Semi-finals
First leg

Second leg

Blackpool won 6–4 on aggregate.

Cardiff City 3–3 Leicester City on aggregate. Cardiff City won 4–3 on penalties.

Final

League One

Semi-finals
First leg

Second leg

Charlton Athletic 3–3 Swindon Town on aggregate. Swindon Town won 5–4 on penalties.

Millwall won 2–0 on aggregate.

Final

League Two

Semi-finals
First leg

Second leg

Rotherham United won 3–0 on aggregate.

Dagenham & Redbridge won 7–2 on aggregate.

Final

References

External links
Football League website

 
English Football League play-offs
Play-offs
May 2010 sports events in Europe